Vijayapuri Veeran is a 1960 Indian Tamil-language swashbuckler film directed by Joseph Thaliath Jr. and written by A. C. Tirulokchandar. An adaptation of the novel The Three Musketeers by Alexandre Dumas, it stars C. L. Anandan (in his acting debut), M. Hemalatha, S. A. Ashokan and S. V. Ramadas in lead roles.

Plot

Cast 

Male cast
 C. L. Anand as Anandan
 S. A. Ashokan  as Nanjappan
 S. V. Ramadas as Veera Nathan
 Pandi Selvaraj as Kavi Gnananathan
 Tiruchi Ganesan as Vijayapuri King
 S. Rama Rao as Aathi
 P. B. Vairam as Maya's spy
 Stunt Swaminathan as Ellappan
 Master Gopal as Azhagapuri King

Female cast
 M. Hemalatha as Kanchana Devi
 Kamini as Maya Devi
 R. Chandrakantha as Shanthi
 T. Shanmugasundari as Jothi
Dance
 V. N. Janaki
 Rajeswari
 Sakunthala
 Madhuri Devi

Production 
Vijayapuri Veeran, an adaptation of the Alexandre Dumas novel The Three Musketeers, was directed by Joseph Thaliath Jr., written by A. C. Tirulokchandar and produced by Joseph Thomas under Citadel Film Corporation. The dialogues were written by Nanjilnaadu T. N. Rajappa, cinematography was handled by R. N. Pillai, and editing by P. V. Karunakaran. The cast featured mainly newcomers such as C. L. Anandan, M. Hemalatha, Kamini, R. Chandrakantha, S. V. Ramadas, Pandi Selvaraj and S. Rama Rao.

Soundtrack 
The music was composed by T. R. Pappa and lyrics were written by Thanjai N. Ramaiah Dass, K. D. Santhanam and M. K. Aathmanathan.

Release and reception 
Vijayapuri Veeran was released on 12 February 1960, and emerged a commercial success.

References

External links 
 

1960 films
1960s historical adventure films
1960s Tamil-language films
Films based on The Three Musketeers
Films directed by Joseph Thaliath Jr.
Films scored by T. R. Pappa
Indian black-and-white films
Indian historical adventure films
Indian swashbuckler films